Kin Ya'a is a Chacoan great house and the center of a significant Ancestral Puebloan outlier community.

The unexcavated building has thirty-five rooms and four kivas, one of which is a four-story tower kiva that can be seen from several miles away. Dendrochronology indicates the structure was built during the late 11th and early 12th centuries. More than one hundred small building sites have been located within . The great house is connected to Chaco Canyon by the South Road. As a detached unit of Chaco Culture National Historical Park, the site is controlled by the National Park Service.

References

Bibliography

 

Archaeological sites in New Mexico
Chaco Canyon
Chaco Culture National Historical Park
Colorado Plateau
Ancestral Puebloans